The 2019 UEFA European Under-21 Championship (also known as UEFA Under-21 Euro 2019) was the 22nd edition of the UEFA European Under-21 Championship (25th edition if the Under-23 era is also included), the biennial international youth football championship organised by UEFA for the men's under-21 national teams of Europe. The final tournament was hosted by Italy (and some matches by San Marino) in mid-2019, after their bid was selected by the UEFA Executive Committee on 9 December 2016 in Nyon, Switzerland.

A total of twelve teams played in the tournament, with players born on or after 1 January 1996 eligible to participate.

Same as previous Under-21 Championships that were held one year prior to the Olympics, this tournament served as European qualifying for the Olympic football tournament, with the top four teams of the tournament qualifying for the 2020 Summer Olympic men's football tournament in Japan, where they will be represented by their under-23 national teams with maximum of three overage players allowed. The four teams that qualified for the Olympic Games were the ones that qualified for the knockout stage of this championship. For the first time, the video assistant referee (VAR) system was used at the UEFA European Under-21 Championship.

Germany were the defending champions.

Hosts
In 2015 the Italian Football Federation confirmed that Italy would bid to host the tournament in 2019, which also involved the San Marino Football Federation. Italy and San Marino were appointed as hosts at a meeting of the UEFA Executive Committee in Nyon on 9 December 2016.

Qualification

All 55 UEFA nations entered the competition, and with the hosts Italy qualifying automatically (the other co-hosts San Marino would not qualify automatically), the other 54 teams competed in the qualifying competition to determine the remaining eleven spots in the final tournament. The qualifying competition, which took place from March 2017 to November 2018, consisted of two rounds:
Qualifying group stage: The 54 teams were drawn into nine groups of six teams. Each group was played in home-and-away round-robin format. The nine group winners qualified directly for the final tournament, while the four best runners-up (not counting results against the sixth-placed team) advanced to the play-offs.
Play-offs: The four teams were drawn into two ties to play home-and-away two-legged matches to determine the last two qualified teams.

Qualified teams
The following teams qualified for the final tournament.

Note: All appearance statistics include only U-21 era (since 1978).

Notes

Final draw
The final draw was held on 23 November 2018, 18:00 CET (UTC+1), at the Lamborghini headquarters in Sant'Agata Bolognese, hosted by Mia Ceran and conducted by tournament ambassador Andrea Pirlo, who won the tournament in 2000.

The 12 teams were drawn into three groups of four teams. Italy, the host country, was assigned to position A1 in the draw, while the other teams were seeded according to their coefficient ranking following the end of the qualifying stage, calculated based on the following:
2015 UEFA European Under-21 Championship final tournament and qualifying competition (20%)
2017 UEFA European Under-21 Championship final tournament and qualifying competition (40%)
2019 UEFA European Under-21 Championship qualifying competition (group stage only) (40%)

Each group contained either the hosts or one team from Pot 1 (which were drawn to position B1 or C1), and one team from Pot 2 and two teams from Pot 3 (which were drawn to any of the positions 2–4 in the groups). The draw pots were as follows:

Venues
On 9 December 2016, Italian Football Federation pre-selected venues (including one inside San Marino territory):
Stadio Renato Dall'Ara in Bologna, Italy
Mapei Stadium – Città del Tricolore in Reggio Emilia, Italy
Stadio Dino Manuzzi in Cesena, Italy
Stadio Nereo Rocco in Trieste, Italy
Dacia Arena in Udine, Italy
San Marino Stadium in Serravalle, San Marino

Match officials

Video Assistant Referees (VAR)
 Stuart Attwell & Paul Tierney (England) 
 Ricardo de Burgos Bengoetxea & Xavier Estrada Fernández (Spain)
 Ruddy Buquet & François Letexier (France)
 Christian Dingert & Tobias Stieler  (Germany)
 Michael Fabbri & Marco Guida  (Italy)
 Jochem Kamphuis & Bas Nijhuis (Netherlands)
 Luís Godinho & João Pinheiro (Portugal)

Squads

Each national team had to submit a squad of 23 players, three of whom had to be goalkeepers, at least 10 full days before the opening match. If a player was injured or ill severely enough to prevent his participation in the tournament before his team's first match, he could be replaced by another player.

Group stage
The group winners and the best runners-up advanced to the semi-finals and qualified for the 2020 Summer Olympics.

Tiebreakers
In the group stage, teams were ranked according to points (3 points for a win, 1 point for a draw, 0 points for a loss), and if tied on points, the following tiebreaking criteria would be applied, in the order given, to determine the rankings (Regulations Articles 18.01 and 18.02):
Points in head-to-head matches among tied teams;
Goal difference in head-to-head matches among tied teams;
Goals scored in head-to-head matches among tied teams;
If more than two teams are tied, and after applying all head-to-head criteria above, a subset of teams are still tied, all head-to-head criteria above would be reapplied exclusively to this subset of teams;
Goal difference in all group matches;
Goals scored in all group matches;
Penalty shoot-out if only two teams have the same number of points, and they met in the last round of the group and are tied after applying all criteria above (not used if more than two teams have the same number of points, or if their rankings are not relevant for qualification for the next stage);
Disciplinary points (red card = 3 points, yellow card = 1 point, expulsion for two yellow cards in one match = 3 points);
Position in the UEFA under-21 national team coefficient ranking for the final draw.

All times are local, CEST (UTC+2).

Group A

Group B

Group C

Ranking of second-placed teams

The match-ups of the semi-finals depended on which runners-up qualified (Regulations Article 17.02):

Knockout stage
In the knockout stage, extra time and a penalty shoot-out were used to decide the winners if necessary.

Bracket

Semi-finals

Final

Goalscorers

Awards
The following awards were given at the conclusion of the tournament:
Player of the Tournament:  Fabián
Golden Boot:  Luca Waldschmidt

Team of the tournament
After the tournament the Under-21 Team of the Tournament was selected by the UEFA Technical Observers.

Qualified teams for 2020 Summer Olympics
The following four teams from UEFA qualified for the 2020 Summer Olympic men's football tournament.

1 Bold indicates champions for that year. Italic indicates hosts for that year.
2 The team represented the United Team of Germany in 1956, and the Federal Republic of Germany (i.e., West Germany) in 1972, 1984 and 1988.

England were ineligible for the Olympics as they are not an Olympic nation (while an agreement was reached between the four British football associations to enter the Great Britain women's team, no agreement was reached for the men's team). Had they reached the semi-finals, the last Olympic spot would have gone to the winner of an Olympic play-off match, scheduled to be played at Stadio Dino Manuzzi, Cesena on 28 June 2019, 21:00 CEST, between the two group runners-up which did not qualify for the semi-finals. However, when England failed to advance out of the group stage, this match was cancelled.

International broadcasters

Television 
All 21 matches were live streamed for the unsold markets via UEFA.tv and highlights were also available for all territories around the world via the UEFA YouTube channel.

Participating nations

Non-participating European nations

Outside Europe

Radio

Participating nations

Non-participating European nations

Outside Europe

References

External links

2019 U21 EURO final tournament: Italy, UEFA.com

 
2019
Under-21 Championship
International association football competitions hosted by Italy
2018–19 in Italian football
2019 in youth association football
2018–19 in San Marino football
International association football competitions hosted by San Marino
June 2019 sports events in Europe
Uefa